Rutgerus (Rudie) Liebrechts (born 6 September 1941) is a former Dutch speed skater and racing cyclist.

Liebrechts was born in Vlaardingen and was among the best Dutch speed skaters from 1961 to 1967.  He twice became Dutch Allround champion, in 1963 and 1964, while he finished second in 1965 (behind Ard Schenk), and third in 1966 (behind Kees Verkerk and Ard Schenk).

He had his biggest international successes at the World Allround Speed Skating Championships, where he twice won a bronze medal overall. In 1961 in Gothenburg he finished behind his compatriot Henk van der Grift and the Russian Viktor Kosichkin, while in 1964 in Helsinki he followed the Norwegian Knut Johannesen and Viktor Kosichkin, again. At the 1964 Winter Olympics in Innsbruck he missed out on medals, finishing 10th in the 1500m, 8th in the 5000m, and a close 4th on the 10,000m.

In 1965 at the Bislett stadion in Oslo he broke the world record on the 3000m.

Rudie Liebrechts also was a reasonably successful cyclist at the national level; in 1965 he won the tour of Gouda.

World records

Source: SpeedSkatingStats.com

References 

 Rudie Liebrechts at SpeedSkatingStats.com
From the bike on the ice Biography in Dutch.
Rudie Liebrechts at SchaatsStatistieken.nl (Dutch)

1941 births
Living people
Dutch male speed skaters
Olympic speed skaters of the Netherlands
Dutch male cyclists
People from Vlaardingen
Speed skaters at the 1964 Winter Olympics
World record setters in speed skating
Sportspeople from South Holland
World Allround Speed Skating Championships medalists
Cyclists from South Holland
20th-century Dutch people
21st-century Dutch people